On Tour may refer to:

 On Tour (Yann Tiersen album), 2006
 On Tour (Ernest Tubb album), 1962
 On Tour (Trio X album), 2001
 On Tour (1990 film), a 1990 Italian film
 On Tour (2010 film), a 2010 French film
 Guitar Hero: On Tour series, a 2008 video game
 On Tour (song), a song by Bliss n Eso
 On Tour (EP), an EP by Luba
 Sphere On Tour, 1985